Gideon Wrampling (born 26 July 2001 in New Zealand) is a New Zealand rugby union player who plays for the  in Super Rugby. His playing position is centre or wing.

Rugby career

Gideon attended St Paul's Collegiate School and was selected for New Zealand Schoolboys and New Zealand under-20.

He joined the  2020 Mitre 10 Cup squad.

He was named in the Chiefs squad for round 10 of the 2021 Super Rugby Aotearoa season.

Reference list

External links
itsrugby.co.uk profile

2001 births
New Zealand rugby union players
Living people
Rugby union centres
Rugby union wings
Waikato rugby union players
Chiefs (rugby union) players